Raúl González Robles (born 25 April 1991), sometimes known simply as Raúl, is a Spanish footballer who plays as a forward for Hércules CF.

Club career
Raúl was born in Alicante, Valencian Community, playing youth football for three local clubs including Hércules CF. In the 2012–13 season he was promoted to the first team, finally settling on jersey 26 (a youth squad number) for financial purposes.

Raúl made his debut in Segunda División on 26 August 2012, coming on as a 60th-minute substitute for Alberto Escassi in an eventual 1–2 derby home loss against Elche CF. On 9 January of the following year, however, he was loaned to neighbouring Orihuela CF until the end of the season.

References

External links
 Hércules official profile 
 

1991 births
Living people
Footballers from Alicante
Spanish footballers
Association football forwards
Segunda División players
Segunda División B players
Tercera División players
Hércules CF B players
Hércules CF players
Orihuela CF players
Yeclano Deportivo players
Novelda CF players
Ontinyent CF players
CD Ebro players
Lleida Esportiu footballers